Telogalla is a genus of lichenicolous fungi in the family Verrucariaceae. It has two species. The genus was circumscribed by Nikolaus Hoffmann and Josef Hafellner.

Species
Telogalla cajasensis  – host: Leptogium
Telogalla olivieri  – host: Xanthoria

The species Telogalla physciicola  is now known as Lichenochora physciicola.

References

Verrucariales
Eurotiomycetes genera
Taxa named by Josef Hafellner
Taxa described in 2000
Lichenicolous fungi